Francisco Ruiz-Jarabo Baquero (28 January 1901 – 26 September 1990) was a Spanish politician who served as Minister of Justice of Spain between 1973 and 1975, during the Francoist dictatorship.

References

1901 births
1990 deaths
Justice ministers of Spain
Government ministers during the Francoist dictatorship